Belippo anguina is an endemic jumping spider species that lives in São Tomé and Príncipe. It was first identified in 1910 by Simon from a juvenile specimen and is the type species for the genus Belippo. Its female holotype measures 4 mm.

References

Further reading
Wanless, 1978 : A revision of the spider genera Belippo and Myrmarachne (Araneae: Salticidae) in the Ethiopian region. Bulletin of the British Museum of Natural History (Zool.), vol. 33, p. 1-139

Endemic fauna of São Tomé and Príncipe
Fauna of São Tomé Island
Salticidae
Spiders of Africa
Spiders described in 1910